Arques is a commune in the Pas-de-Calais department in northern France, bordering Saint-Omer.

Geography
Arques is situated in the middle of the Hauts-de-France region, 40 km from Calais and Dunkerque, and 45 km from Boulogne-sur-Mer. It lies on the border of the departments of Pas-de-Calais and Nord.

The town is crossed by the Neufossé Canal, which connects the rivers Aa and Lys. The commune also includes several lakes—Beauséjour, Arc-en-ciel, Malhôve, Batavia—and part of the forest of Rihout-Clairmarais.

History
Arques is in the region of French Flanders. As this area has been under Belgian, English, French and Spanish rule, many of the names are French versions of names in other languages.

In the wake of the Battle of the Golden Spurs a battle was fought here in April 1303 between French and Flemish. The Flemish were victorious in the Battle of Arques (1303). Arques is not to be confused with Arques-la-Bataille, where the Battle of Arques (1589) took place. It is also close to Agincourt.

It was one of the first towns in the region which subscribed to Agenda 21.

Possible Roman influence

There is a possibility of Arques being the Roman Port of 'Marcae' mentioned in the Litus Saxonicum as there appears to be research in the UK that the high sea levels were about 4.5 metres higher in late Roman times than that of today.

Arques is between Oudenberg and Boulogne (both Saxon Shore forts) and appears to be land if the sea level is raised 4.5 metres in which case would mean Arques would have been a well protected harbour inland from the town.

Population

Economy
Arques is famous for its crystal manufacture. It has been the headquarters of Arc International, the largest manufacturer of glassware in the world, since its inception in the 19th century.

Places of interest
 The Fontinettes Boat Lift and the Arques lock (l'écluse des Fontinettes, not to be confused with l'ecluse de Flandres, a smaller lock, also in Arques)
 Arc International
 The Aa Valley Tourist Railroad (CFTVA: Chemin de Fer Touristique de la vallée de l'Aa) which runs between Arques and Lumbres
 The Audomarais marshes and the Parc naturel régional des caps et marais d'Opale (a park that runs from the Opal Coast landinwards)
 It is near the Forest of Éperlecques, which houses the Blockhaus d'Éperlecques
 The local church, château and town hall

There is a town walk which takes in most of these sites and can be downloaded from the town website.

The town is a ville fleurie and is rated with three flowers.

La Goudale have relocated to Arques from Douai, to a state of the art brewery which can be visited.

See also
Communes of the Pas-de-Calais department
Canton of Arques

References

External links
 Town website

Gallery

Communes of Pas-de-Calais